John Joseph Leeming, (1899 – 1981), BSc, ACGI, FICE, MI Struct E, MI Mun E, F Inst HE, was a British civil engineer and traffic engineer. He forwarded controversial ideas for the causes of, and remedies for, road traffic accidents (RTAs), including the notion that drivers should not always be assumed to be at fault.

Biography

Leeming was born in 1899 and served in the First World War. From 1924 he worked in various road engineering capacities for Oxfordshire County Council, latterly as deputy county surveyor until he left for Dorset in 1946. Leeming supervised the rebuilding of some historic bridges in Oxfordshire and what was then Berkshire, including Abingdon Bridge in 1927, Cropredy Bridge in 1937 and Shilton Bridge in 1938. He wrote or co-wrote articles about these bridges that were published in the Oxford Architectural and Historical Society's journal Oxoniensia.

In 1946 Leeming moved to work for Dorset County Council as county surveyor, where he stayed until his retirement in 1964. In this period he pioneered road accident investigation. In 1969 his book Road Accidents: prevent or punish? was published. A 2007 review of a reprint of the book described it as controversial, and as being written by an "enlightened highways expert".

The National Motor Museum at Beaulieu, Hampshire holds an archive of Leeming's papers covering the period 1959–72.

Road traffic accident causes
In Road Accidents: prevent or punish? Leeming set out his ideas and views of the causes of road traffic casualties (RTCs), and of how best they can be tackled. The book is described as attacking the beginnings of the blame culture, with Leeming convinced that RTCs could be reduced by using road engineering methods based on evidence derived from the scientific analysis of the causes of RTAs, and that drivers were not the main cause of many road safety problems.

Other observations

Induced demand
Leeming described the phenomenon of induced demand, with respect to road traffic volumes:

Risk compensation
The risk compensation principle, upon which Hans Monderman's counter-intuitive shared space concept is founded, was described by Leeming:

See also
John Adams (geographer)

References

Works

1899 births
1981 deaths
Transport engineers